Morton B. Howell (October 2, 1834 - January 23, 1909) was an American Masonic leader, lawyer and politician. He served as the mayor of Nashville, Tennessee, in 1875–1876.

Early life
Howell was born on October 2, 1834, in Norfolk, Virginia. His father was a Baptist minister. He grew up in Nashville.

Howell attended Union University in Murfreesboro, and he graduated from the Richmond College in Richmond, Virginia, in 1851. He graduated from the University of Virginia School of Law in 1855.

Career
Howell served as clerk and master of Davidson County from 1865 to 1870. He subsequently practised the law privately. One of his clients was the Phillips & Buttorff Manufacturing Company.

Howell became a Mason in 1857. He was the Grand Commander of the Knights Templar of Tennessee in 1874.

Howell served as the mayor of Nashville in 1875-1876. He served as the president of the Nashville Board of Education for 15 years. He was a trustee of the University of Nashville.

Personal life and death
Howell was married to Bette C. Howell. He resided at 1230 2nd Avenue in Nashville.

Howell died on January 23, 1909, in Nashville. His funeral was conducted by Collins Denny, and he was buried in Mount Olivet Cemetery.

References

1834 births
1909 deaths
People from Norfolk, Virginia
University of Richmond alumni
University of Virginia School of Law alumni
American lawyers
Mayors of Nashville, Tennessee
Burials at Mount Olivet Cemetery (Nashville)
American Freemasons